Hashimoto Station may refer to:
Hashimoto Station (Kanagawa), a station in Kanagawa Prefecture, Japan
Hashimoto Station (Kyoto), a station in Kyoto Prefecture, Japan
Hashimoto Station (Wakayama), a station in Wakayama Prefecture, Japan
Hashimoto Station (Fukuoka), a station in Fukuoka Prefecture, Japan